Barry Quin (born 1949) credited also as Barry Quinn, is a British-Australian actor and briefly producer who has appeared on stage and television and film, on the small screen he has featured in numerous TV series and mini-series, but he is best known for his role as an original cast member of TV series Prisoner playing Dr. Greg Miller. He was married to his Prisoner co-star Peta Toppano during the early 1980s, but they divorced after ten years; he has since remarried.

Biography
A graduate of the Central Drama School in London, Quin was primarily a stage actor in his early career. After a small role in the British television series Just William in 1977, he had bit parts on UK sitcom Two's Company and US drama series Charlie's Angels.

He was touring Australia as part of a stage production of Othello when he met his future wife Peta Toppano. While auditioning for Prisoner, Toppano suggested Quin for the role of Greg Miller when she learned the producer was looking for an actor to play a young prison doctor. Both their characters were introduced with the storyline of the two having had a prior relationship as old college sweethearts. Shortly after the series debuted, they were married in April 1979. The two remained on the series until the end of the 1979 season, when they were written out for their characters too, to be married.

In 1980, he would star in the television miniseries Lucinda Brayford co-starring Wendy Hughes and Sam Neill and, the following year, in Sara Dane. He appeared in a number of television series including M.P.S.I.B. and Carson's Law. Although having minor roles in I Can't Get Started and Departure, he had moderate success as Lt. Zachariah Hicks in the 1987 television miniseries Captain James Cook followed by Emma: Queen of the South Seas (1987) and Cappuccino (1989) in which he was also credited as an associate producer.

After Darlings of the Gods (1989), Quin took a leave of absence from acting coinciding with his divorce from Peta Toppano. He returned to acting three years later with a guest appearance on Police Rescue and Mission Top Secret. Before long, he began playing recurring characters on Big Sky and Mirror, Mirror II. He also made guest appearances on Murder Call, Water Rats, Sir Arthur Conan Doyle's The Lost World, The Secret Life of Us, Love My Way and All Saints.

In April 2002, he also returned to the stage performing as Gordon in David Williamson's Soulmates at the Sydney Opera House. After a cameo appearance as a news anchorman in Superman Returns (2006), Quin made several appearances as Geoff Olivetti in Home and Away between 2006 and 2009.

Barry also played the character Professor Sorvad in the 2011 Australian comedy movie Dealing with Destiny.

He also played 'Phil' in two episodes of the YouTube web series The Horizon in 2013.

Filmography

References

External links
 

Living people
Australian male film actors
Australian male soap opera actors
Australian male stage actors
English male film actors
English male soap opera actors
English male stage actors
Male actors from London
1949 births
English emigrants to Australia
20th-century Australian male actors
20th-century English male actors
21st-century Australian male actors
21st-century English male actors